Cahokia Heights is a city in St. Clair County, Illinois, United States. It was founded on May 6, 2021, by the merger of the villages of Cahokia and Alorton and the city of Centreville.  On May 6, 2021, Curtis McCall Sr. was sworn in as the city's first mayor, having run unopposed.

History

Better Together
The formation of Cahokia Heights was part of a campaign and four-phase plan called "Better Together".

Curtis McCall Sr. Centreville Township Supervisor, led the consolidation efforts.  His son Curtis McCall Jr. was mayor (village president) of Cahokia at the time; the mayor (village president) of Alorton, and clerk, cashier was JoAnne Reed; and the mayor of Centreville was Marius "Mark" Jackson; all were proponents of the merger.

In the first phase of the plan was a March 2020 referendum to merge Alorton and Centreville, into a city named Alcentra, which passed by about 76% in each.  The second phase of the plan was another referendum, held in November 2020, for Alorton, Cahokia, Centreville to merge into a city named Cahokia Heights.  The referendum merging the 3 municipalities was approved, 61% to 37%, in the November 3, 2020, election.

The third and fourth phases were advertised as dissolving Centreville Township and the Commonfields of Cahokia district.  The referendum to dissolve the Commonfields of Cahokia Public Water District passed with 82% approval in the April 2021 election.  In the same election, voters of Cahokia Heights passed referendums to grant home rule to the city, to extend the Cahokia Public Library District across the city, and elect McCall Sr. as mayor.

Geography

Climate

Demographics

Transportation
Cahokia Heights is home to the St. Louis Downtown Airport, a general aviation facility.

Metro operates the #2 bus route to East St. Louis, Illinois, where connections can be made to the MetroLink light rail to St. Louis.

Education
Cahokia Unit School District 187 operates public schools, while some areas are served by East St. Louis School District 189.

References

Cities in St. Clair County, Illinois
2021 establishments in Illinois
Cities in Illinois
Populated places established in 2021